Vigo County Home for Dependent Children, also known as the Glenn Home, is a historic orphanage located in Lost Creek Township, Vigo County, Indiana. The main building was built in 1903, and is a -story, Colonial Revival style brick building on a raised basement.  It has a hipped and gabled roof and features a semi-circular, two-story portico with four Doric order columns. Also on the property is a contributing former boiler house.  The main building is the home of the Pi Kappa Alpha fraternity chapter at Rose-Hulman Institute of Technology.

In the1970's Glenn Home was the location of one of the most abusive orphanages in USA history. The abuses included psychological, emotional, physical and/or sexual on children as young as 10 years of age. To this day Vigo County, the Methodist Church of Indiana and other have not acknowledged the atrocities even though many of the former residents have come forward with their stories. https://www.facebook.com/glennhomeabuse 

It was listed on the National Register of Historic Places in 2000.

References

Government buildings on the National Register of Historic Places in Indiana
Colonial Revival architecture in Indiana
Government buildings completed in 1903
Buildings and structures in Vigo County, Indiana
National Register of Historic Places in Terre Haute, Indiana